Sangi Dari Bubak (also Romanized as Sangī Darī Būbaḵ; also known as Sang-e Darī and Sangi Dari) is a village in Meyghan Rural District, in the Central District of Nehbandan County, South Khorasan Province, Iran. At the 2006 census, its population was 43, in 10 families.

References 

Populated places in Nehbandan County